Maxim A. Karpov (born October 19, 1991) is a Russian professional ice hockey player. He currently plays for Metallurg Magnitogorsk in the Kontinental Hockey League (KHL).

Playing career
Born in Chelyabinsk, Russia, Karpov joined Mechel Chelyabinsk of the Russia 3 league in 2006–07 for one game. He played his first season with Mechel the following year and played with Mechel through the 2011–12 season, playing for the organization in the Russia 3, Russia 2, VHL and MHL leagues. In 2012, Karpov joined Traktor Chelyabinsk of the KHL for one season before moving on the Dynamo Moscow.

After four seasons with Dynamo, Karpov while still contracted was granted free agent status from the KHL following the 2016–17 season, due to the club's debt on July 4, 2017. He promptly signed a one-year contract with reigning champions, SKA Saint Petersburg, the following day on July 5, 2017.

As an impending free agent from SKA, Karpov was traded to Amur Khabarovsk before he moved to fellow KHL outfit Metallurg Magnitogorsk, signing a two-year contract on 2 June 2020.

References

External links
 

1991 births
Living people
HC Dynamo Moscow players
Metallurg Magnitogorsk players
SKA Saint Petersburg players
Traktor Chelyabinsk players
Russian ice hockey forwards